Guny is a commune in the Aisne department in Hauts-de-France in northern France.

History
In 858, Guny's village is given to the abbey of Notre-Dame of Soissons by Charles the Bold.

In 1368, Enguerrand VII of Coucy grants the collectivity franchise to Guny and twenty-two other churches.

1914–1918, World War I devastated the village. From August 27 until September 28, the 11th and 20th infantry fight Battle of Ailette around Guny's quarries.

Saint Georges' church is destroyed. It was restored in 1923.

A new bell was inaugurated in November 1923, in a temporary church.

Geography
The river Ailette forms all of the commune's northeastern border.

Population

See also
Communes of the Aisne department

References

Communes of Aisne
Aisne communes articles needing translation from French Wikipedia